In probability theory, Kelly's lemma states that for a stationary continuous-time Markov chain, a process defined as the time-reversed process has the same stationary distribution as the forward-time process. The theorem is named after Frank Kelly.

Statement

For a continuous time Markov chain with state space S and transition-rate matrix Q (with elements qij) if we can find a set of non-negative numbers q'ij and a positive measure π that satisfy the following conditions 

then q'''ij are the rates for the reversed process and π is proportional to the stationary distribution for both processes.

Proof

Given the assumptions made on the qij and π we have
,
so the global balance equations are satisfied and the measure π is proportional to the stationary distribution of the original process.
By symmetry, the same argument shows that π'' is also proportional to the stationary distribution of the reversed process.

References

Markov processes
Queueing theory